The music of the 2011 video game Minecraft, developed by Mojang Studios, primarily consists of two soundtrack albums by German musician Daniel Rosenfeld, also known as C418. American composer Lena Raine has also contributed with one album and two extended plays since 2020. Music included in downloadable content (DLC) for legacy console versions of the game was handled by British musician Gareth Coker, who released six soundtrack albums from 2016 to 2020.

Rosenfeld was solely responsible for the soundtrack for the Java Edition of the game until 2020, with Minecraft – Volume Alpha (2011) and its follow-up double album Minecraft – Volume Beta (2013) both released independently. With the launch of various DLC for Minecraft: Bedrock Edition in 2016, Coker issued three soundtrack albums, producing an additional three in the following four years. In 2020, Raine released the Minecraft: Nether Update EP and has since issued one album – Minecraft: Caves & Cliffs (2021) featuring contributions by Kumi Tanioka, and an additional EP for the game's Wild Update (2022) with Samuel Åberg. Citing licensing issues with Microsoft, an original third album composed by Rosenfeld, which was first hinted at in 2015, has still not come to fruition. His final contribution to the game was in 2018, releasing three singles for its Aquatic Update.

Sonically, the soundtrack consists largely of ambient music and has been lauded by critics – in 2011, video game blog Kotaku cited it as one of the best video game soundtracks of that year.

Minecraft soundtrack

In a panel at MineCon in 2012, Rosenfeld stated that he has had a long-term interest in video games and was involved with several video game communities. He met Markus Persson in an Internet Relay Chat (IRC) and began composing music for Minecraft when the game was in its very early stages as a tech demo. The two shared interest in Aphex Twin and exchanged each other's projects. Both were impressed by each other's work, and eventually, Persson chose to pair Rosenfeld's music with his game.

Minecraft – Volume Alpha 

The first instalment of the game's soundtrack, Minecraft – Volume Alpha, was released digitally on 4 March 2011 independently by Rosenfeld. The album comprises most of the music featured in the game and its trailers, as well as instrumentals not included in the final release of Minecraft. The album was met with positive reviews, with Andy Kellman from AllMusic praising its replay value, stating that "none of the recurring elements is pronounced or simple enough to become fatiguing with repeated play". Rosenfeld has said that the minimalist nature of his work was "unavoidable", as "Minecraft has a terrible sound engine". In June 2015, the record received its first pressing to vinyl and CD through American record label Ghostly. In 2022, the album was nominated for Top Dance/Electronic Album at the Billboard Music Awards.

Minecraft – Volume Beta 

On 9 November 2013, Rosenfeld released Minecraft – Volume Beta as his fifth studio album and the game's second soundtrack album. It includes music sonically described as having a darker tone than Volume Alpha, added into the game in various updates following his first record. It also contains audio from 10 of the 13 collectable music discs within the game. In 2013, the album appeared on the Billboard Dance/Electronic Albums chart, peaking at number 14.

Further contributions by C418
In 2018, Rosenfeld released three singles that would later be added alongside the game's Aquatic Update – "Dragon Fish" on 9 August, "Shuniji" on 10 November and "Axolotl" on 12 December.

Rosenfeld first hinted at a potential third soundtrack album in 2015, commenting "I'll still work on Minecraft, so there'll probably be another album". He confirmed the future release in 2017 but claimed it was "still far from done". The musician confirmed on Twitter that the record would be longer than the previous two albums combined, which in total is over three hours and 18 minutes. On 8 January 2021, Rosenfeld was asked in an interview with Anthony Fantano whether or not there was still a third volume of the soundtrack in production. Rosenfeld responded that "I have something—I consider it finished—but things have become complicated, especially as Minecraft is now a big property, so I don't know".

Nether Update 

On 8 April 2020, it was announced Lena Raine, known for her work on the Celeste soundtrack, composed new music for Minecraft's 1.16 Nether Update. Admitting to feeling intimidated by the task of composing music for the game, stating "introducing something new can possibly feel like an intrusion", Raine submitted a demo soundtrack to Mojang, based on her album Oneknowing.

Raine said she wanted "to give the music a personal flavor, while also holding true to the vibe of the original soundtrack". Predominantly performed on the piano, the three ambient tracks saw Raine challenge herself "to see how far I could push the sound of the piano until it resembled other things entirely". Alongside three new ambient tracks, Raine also composed "Pigstep" for an in-game music disc. On the soundtrack version, which was released on 14 June 2020, "Pigstep" has two different mixes.

Caves & Cliffs 

On 20 October 2021, the fourth official release of the Minecraft soundtrack was released, with songs written and produced by Lena Raine and Kumi Tanioka, known for working on music for Final Fantasy and Hyrule Warriors. The album contains ten tracks that were introduced in the 1.18 update of Minecraft and "Otherside", composed by Raine, which is a new in-game music disc.

The Wild Update 

On 20 April 2022, the fifth official release of the Minecraft soundtrack was released, with songs written and produced by Lena Raine and Samuel Åberg. The EP contains four tracks that were introduced in the 1.19 update of Minecraft.

DLC soundtrack
While Rosenfeld once composed holiday themed music in downloadable content (DLC) for console editions of the game in 2014, British composer Gareth Coker has been responsible for the bulk of music for DLC in Minecraft: Bedrock Edition.

On 21 December 2016, Coker released the albums Battle & Tumble, Chinese Mythology and Greek Mythology to complement three downloadable packs in Bedrock Edition. Two more records of similar themes, Norse Mythology and Egyptian Mythology, were released in December 2017 and May 2018 respectively. Coker's final album for DLC was for the Glide Mini Game, releasing on 22 December 2020. Unlike previous work by Rosenfeld, all of Coker's albums for Minecraft were released under Microsoft's own label.

Reception
The soundtrack's minimalistic and melancholic composition has been praised by critics. The ambient music style of the soundtrack has been compared to the works of Brian Eno, Erik Satie, Aphex Twin, and Vangelis. In 2018, the Boar described the soundtrack's composition as "nostalgia in its purest form".

In 2022, the Minecraft soundtrack placed at number 54 on the ABC Classic 100 countdown, as voted by listeners.

Discography
Rosenfeld originally uploaded his two soundtrack albums to Bandcamp and streaming services, but have since received physical versions issued by Ghostly. In 2015 and 2020 respectively, Volume Alpha and Volume Beta received both CD and LP formats. Coker and Raine's releases are only available through digital formats.

Charts

References

External links
 Lena Raine's Website
 C418's Website

Minecraft
Minecraft
Album chart usages for BillboardDanceElectronic